Prata is a village in Bieha Department, Sissili Province in southern Burkina Faso, near the border with Ghana.

External links
 "Prata Map — Satellite Images of Prata" Maplandia World Gazetteer

Populated places in the Centre-Ouest Region
Sissili Province